Spencer Butte is a prominent landmark in Lane County, Oregon, United States, described in the National Geodetic Survey as "a prominent timbered butte with a bare rocky summit" on the southern edge of Eugene, with an elevation of . Spencer Butte is accessible from Spencer Butte Park and has several hiking trails to the summit. The tree cover on the butte is predominantly Douglas fir; however, the butte is treeless at its summit.  The butte is the tallest point visible when looking south from downtown Eugene.

Name

The butte was called Champ-a te or Cham-o-tee by the native Kalapuya, meaning rattlesnake.

One popular theory is that Spencer Butte was named for a young Englishman of the Hudson's Bay Company named Spencer, who was said to have been killed by the Kalapuya after climbing the hill alone. Another, less popular theory holds that the butte was named after Secretary of War John C. Spencer in July 1845 by Elijah White. Spencer was no longer Secretary of War by 1845, however.

In popular culture

 The song "All Of Me Wants All You" by Sufjan Stevens mentions Spencer Butte twice; the song is from the album Carrie & Lowell, which also includes a song titled "Eugene" after the city, and makes many other references to places in Oregon.

References

External links
 
 Official website

Buttes of Oregon
Geography of Eugene, Oregon
Landforms of Lane County, Oregon
Mountains of Oregon
Parks in Eugene, Oregon